The Scarlet Letter is a lost 1908 silent American short film, directed by Sidney Olcott. It was based on the 1850 novel of the same name by Nathaniel Hawthorne. The screenplay was written by Gene Gauntier, who also played the character Hester Prynne. The film was produced by Kalem Company.

It was Jack Conway's first film as an actor. He later went on to direct films such as While the City Sleeps and Libeled Lady. Ruth Roland was also in the cast.

Plot 
Hester Prynne becomes pregnant while her husband is absent. In June 1642, in the Puritan town of Boston, a crowd gathers to witness the punishment of Prynne, who is found guilty of adultery. She is required to wear a scarlet "A" ("A" is the symbol of adultery ) on her dress to shame her. Pastor Dimmesdale, who seduced the woman, hypocritically becomes one of her accusers.

References

 The New York Dramatic Mirror, March 21, 1908; March 28, 1908
 Views & Films Index, March 21, 1908, p 10

Sources 
The Scarlet Letter (1908) on Internet Movie Database
Jack Conway on Internet Movie Database

External links
 AFI Catalog

 The Scarlet Letter website dedicated to Sidney Olcott

1908 films
Lost American films
Silent American drama films
American silent short films
Films directed by Sidney Olcott
1908 short films
1908 drama films
American black-and-white films
1908 lost films
Lost drama films
Films based on The Scarlet Letter
1900s American films